Sanjivani: A Medical Boon was an Indian television series touted as the first medical drama TV show which was broadcast on StarPlus. It is also the first Indian series with discuss on HIV. The show stars Rupali Ganguly, Mohnish Bahl, Gurdeep Kohli, Mihir Mishra, Sanjeet Bedi, Iravati Harshe.

A sequel series Dill Mill Gaye was premiered on 2007 on Star One and a reboot version also named Sanjivani premiered on Star Plus on 12 August 2019.

Plot
Sanjivani narrates a story about four medical interns namely Dr. Juhi Singh, Dr. Rahul Mehra, Dr. Simran Chopra and Dr. Omi Joshi and the trials and tribulations they face to fight a constant battle against diseases and death of patients while balancing their professional and personal life.

Cast

Main
 Gurdeep Kohli as Dr Juhi Singh-Rahul's wife, CMO of Sanjivani, Surgeon
 Gaurav Chanana / Mihir Mishra as Dr Rahul Mehra, Juhi's husband, Simran's ex-husband, Pediatrician.
 Mohnish Behl as Dr Shashank Gupta, Surgeon, Smriti's husband, Truste of sanjivani.
 Iravati Harshe as Dr. Smriti Malhotra, Gynaecologist, Shashank's wife
 Sanjeet Bedi as Dr Umesh 'Omi' Joshi, HIV Patient.
 Shilpa Kadam / Rupali Ganguly as Dr Simran Chopra, Kamal Chopra's daughter, Rahul's former wife.

Recurring
 Dr. Sagarika Dhawan as baby Anjali, Dr. Shashank and Dr. Smriti's little daughter.
Ketki Dave as Dr. Madhvi Dholakiya, Paediatrician
 Shilpa Shinde as Chitra, Nurse
 Arjun Punj as Dr. Aman / Rajeev Mathur, Juhi's childhood friend
 Madhumalti Kapoor as Biji, Juhi's grandmother
 Shagufta Ali as Tai Ji, Juhi's paying guest owner
 Tarana Raja as Reena, Aman's wife
 Vikram Gokhale as Kamal Chopra, Trustee of Sanjivani, Simran's father
 Sudhanshu Pandey as Vishal Kapoor
 Ashish Chaudhary as Karan
 Smita Bansal aa Neha
 Siddharth Merchant as Chintu
 Rita Bhaduri as Dadi, Rahul's paternal grandmother
 Smita Jaykar / Nandita Puri as Suhasini Mehra, Rahul's mother
 Rajeev Verma - Dr. Yashraj Mehra, Rahul's father, Cardiologist
 Sumeet Raghavan / Vishal Puri as Rajat Mehra, Rahul's brother
 Indrani Haldar as Mrs. Mehta, Accident victim
 Shabbir Ahluwalia as Rohit Rai, Accident victim
 Ankita Bhargava as Anita, Patient's sister-in-law
 Jyotsna Karyekar as Sharda aka Daai Maa, Dr. Shashank's caretaker when he was young
 Sadiya Siddique as Richa Asthana
 Markand Soni as Arman Dr. Shashank Gupta's grandson

Production
Sanjeet Bedi playing Dr. Omi quit the series unhappy with the ongoing story but soon returned in February 2005 for his death sequence when Omi is shown suffering from HIV and dies.

Sequel

From 2007 to 2010, a sequel series Dill Mill Gayye aired on Star One starring Shilpa Anand, Sukirti Kandpal, Jennifer Winget, Karan Singh Grover and Mohnish Bahl.

Adaptations

Reception

Critics
The Indian Express stated, "Sanjivani’s success came from its refreshing storytelling process, script and the performances of the actors. It also had the perfect mix of drama and romance, dollops of emotions and a strange relatability factor that none of the dailies provided during that time."

Ratings
Months after launch, in April 2002, it averaged a low rating of 3.75 TVR while in mid October it rose to 4.08 TVR and in late October to 5.59 TVR. Since December, it steadily rose until June 2003 where in December, January, April, May and June 2003 it garnered  5.92, 6.35, 7.3 (both April and May) and 7.8 TVR. In early July it decreased to 6.9 TVR. In first week of September 2003, it garnered 6.8 TVR while the following week it rose to 7.6 TVR. In first week of August it rose to 8.5 TVR. In week 39, it was at fifteenth position with 7.9 TVR while in week 40 of 2003 (week ending 4 October 2003), it garnered its peak rating of 10.1 TVR entering into top 10 programs for the first time occupying sixth position with the character Dr. Aham's death track. On 19 November 2003, it garnered 8.5 TVR.

References

External links
 

2002 Indian television series debuts
2005 Indian television series endings
Indian television soap operas
StarPlus original programming
Indian medical television series
HIV/AIDS in television